Captain Hugh Mulzac is a  offshore patrol vessel of the Saint Vincent and the Grenadines Coast Guard. Built for the Jamaica Defence Force Coast Guard as HMJS Middlesex in 2005, the vessel was purchased in 2019 by Saint Vincent and the Grenadines. It operates in the territorial waters of the island nation, performing maritime security and search and rescue missions.

Description 
It has a crew of 18 and can host 4 guests, and has advanced X-band radar systems.

History 
The ship was built in the Netherlands by the Damen Group and sold to Jamaica in November 2005. It was decommissioned from the JDF Coast Guard on 8 December 2017 and returned to the Damen Group as collateral in advance of the purchase of two new vessels of the same model. Damen modernized the returned ships, adding two 14.5 mm KPVT heavy machine guns, one on the fore and aft. The Nicaraguan Navy then purchased the vessel along with another County-class ship, commissioning it as Soberanía I. 

Saint Vincent and the Grenadines then purchased the vessel for EC$18 million ($6.7 million) in late 2018, receiving it in December 2018 after a period of maintenance and crew training. The ship was commissioned by Prime Minister Ralph Gonsalves as Captain Hugh Mulzac in Kingstown, Saint Vincent, on 21 January 2019. On 10 April 2019, Captain Hugh Mulzac attended the burning vessel Gem Star in port at the Grenadines Wharf in Kingstown, assisting in water safety and firefighting alongside a Coast Guard RHIB and the tug Captain Bim. By the end of the day, the fire subsided and Captain Hugh Mulzac retired from the scene.

References 

Ships of Saint Vincent and the Grenadines
Military of Jamaica
Patrol boats
2006 ships